Man-Chung Tang Ph.D., P.E., Dist.M.ASCE, NAE, CorrFRSE (born 1938) is a Chinese-born American civil engineer and businessman. Tang is chairman of the board and the technical director of T. Y. Lin International, an American design and construction company.

Biography 
In 1938, Tang was born in Zhaoqing, Guangdong, China. In 1959, Tang graduated from the Chu Hai College in Hong Kong. In 1965, Tang obtained his doctor of engineering degree from Technical University of Darmstadt (TU Darmstadt).

From 1989 to 1995, Tang was an adjunct professor at the Columbia University Department of Civil Engineering and Engineering Mechanics.

In 1965, Tang joined the Oberhausen GHH in Western Germany. In 1968, Tang worked for the Severud & Associates in New York City, US. In 1978, Tang founded for the DRC – an engineering consultancy company. In 1983, Tang founded the Contech – an engineering consultancy company, too. In 1994, Tang founded the DRC in Chongqing, China, now it's China branch of the T.Y.LIN International.

Tang also served as the chairman of the American Society of Civil Engineers (ASCE) committee on Cable-Suspended Bridges. Tang is a former president of the American Segmental Bridge Institute.

Awards and honors 
Tang holds honorary professorship at many universities internationally, including Tsinghua University in Beijing, Tongji University in Shanghai, Southeast University in Nanjing, Zhejiang University in Hangzhou, Chongqing Jiaotong University in Chongqing, Dalian Institute of Technology in Dalian.
 Member, United States National Academy of Engineering, elected in 1995;
 Foreign Member, Chinese Academy of Engineering;
 Honorary Fellow, American Society of Civil Engineers, elected in 1995;
 In 1999, Roebling Award;
 In 1998, John A. Roebling Medal for lifetime achievement in bridge engineering;
 In 2010, Outstanding Projects And Leaders (OPAL) Award, from American Society of Civil Engineers.
 In 2010, International Award of Merit in Structural Engineering from IABSE (International Association for Bridge and Structural Engineering)
 In 2013, the Gold Medal of the Institution of Structural Engineers
 In 2018, elected a Corresponding Fellow of the Royal Society of Edinburgh

List of Tang's projects 

 Seohae Grand Bridge, South Korea; Lapu Arch Bridge, China;
 San Francisco-Oakland Bay Bridge, Oakland, California;
 Sidney Lanier Bridge, New Brunswick, Georgia;
 Second New Haeng Ju Bridge, South Korea;
 Talmadge Memorial Bridge, Savannah, GA:
 Yangpu Bridge, Shanghai, China:
 Annacis Island Bridge, Vancouver, British Columbia, Canada
 Nanjing Yangtze Bridge, China;
 Humen (Bocca Tigris) Bridge, Guandgdong, China;
 Tagus River Bridge, Lisbon, Portugal;
 Xiamen Harbor Bridge, Xiamen, China:
 Penang Bridge, Malaysia;
 Sunshine Skyway Bridge, St. Petersburg, FL;
 ALRT Fraser River Bridge, Vancouver, British Columbia, Canada;
 Baytown Bridge, Houston TX;
 Denny Creek Bridge, WA;
 Shubenacadie River Bridge, Nova Scotia;
 Knie Bridge, Düsseldorf, Germany;
 Pine Valley Bridge, CA;
 Kipapa Stream Bridge, HI;
 Duisburg Neuenkamp Bridge, Duisburg, Germany;
 East Huntington Bridge, Huntington, WV;

References 

1938 births
Living people
Columbia University faculty
21st-century American engineers
American businesspeople
People from Zhaoqing
Members of the United States National Academy of Engineering
Engineers from Guangdong
Chinese emigrants to the United States
Foreign members of the Chinese Academy of Engineering
Technische Universität Darmstadt alumni